Firman Septian (born 23 September 1988) is an Indonesian professional footballer who plays as a winger for Liga 3 club Pekanbaru Warriors FC.

Club career

Sriwijaya
He was signed for Sriwijaya to play in Liga 2 in the 2020 season. This season was suspended on 27 March 2020 due to the COVID-19 pandemic. The season was abandoned and was declared void on 20 January 2021.

PSIM Yogyakarta
In 2021, Firman signed a contract with Indonesian Liga 2 club PSIM Yogyakarta. He made his league debut on 26 September in a 1–0 loss against PSCS Cilacap at the Manahan Stadium, Surakarta.

Honours

Club 
Semen Padang
 Liga 2 runner-up: 2018

References

External links
 Firman Septian at Soccerway
 Firman Septian at Liga Indonesia

1988 births
Living people
Indonesian footballers
PSPS Riau players
Association football forwards
Sportspeople from Jakarta